This is a list of electoral division results for the Australian 1990 federal election in the state of New South Wales.

Overall results

Results by division

Banks 
 This section is an excerpt from Electoral results for the Division of Banks § 1990

Barton 
 This section is an excerpt from Electoral results for the Division of Barton § 1990

Bennelong 
 This section is an excerpt from Electoral results for the Division of Bennelong § 1990

Berowra 
 This section is an excerpt from Electoral results for the Division of Berowra § 1990

Blaxland 
 This section is an excerpt from Electoral results for the Division of Blaxland § 1990

Bradfield 
 This section is an excerpt from Electoral results for the Division of Bradfield § 1990

Calare 
 This section is an excerpt from Electoral results for the Division of Calare § 1990

Charlton 
 This section is an excerpt from Electoral results for the Division of Charlton § 1990

Chifley 
 This section is an excerpt from Electoral results for the Division of Chifley § 1990

Cook 
 This section is an excerpt from Electoral results for the Division of Cook § 1990

Cowper 
 This section is an excerpt from Electoral results for the Division of Cowper § 1990

Cunningham 
 This section is an excerpt from Electoral results for the Division of Cunningham § 1990

Dobell 
 This section is an excerpt from Electoral results for the Division of Dobell § 1990

Dundas 
 This section is an excerpt from Electoral results for the Division of Dundas § 1990

Eden-Monaro 
 This section is an excerpt from Electoral results for the Division of Eden-Monaro § 1990

Farrer 
 This section is an excerpt from Electoral results for the Division of Farrer § 1990

Fowler 
 This section is an excerpt from Electoral results for the Division of Fowler § 1990

Gilmore 
 This section is an excerpt from Electoral results for the Division of Gilmore § 1990

Grayndler 
 This section is an excerpt from Electoral results for the Division of Grayndler § 1990

Greenway 
 This section is an excerpt from Electoral results for the Division of Greenway § 1990

Gwydir 
 This section is an excerpt from Electoral results for the Division of Gwydir § 1990

Hughes 
 This section is an excerpt from Electoral results for the Division of Hughes § 1990

Hume 
 This section is an excerpt from Electoral results for the Division of Hume § 1990

Hunter 
 This section is an excerpt from Electoral results for the Division of Hunter § 1990

Kingsford Smith 
 This section is an excerpt from Electoral results for the Division of Kingsford Smith § 1990

Lindsay 
 This section is an excerpt from Electoral results for the Division of Lindsay § 1990

Lowe 
 This section is an excerpt from Electoral results for the Division of Lowe § 1990

Lyne 
 This section is an excerpt from Electoral results for the Division of Lyne § 1990

Macarthur 
 This section is an excerpt from Electoral results for the Division of Macarthur § 1990

Mackellar 
 This section is an excerpt from Electoral results for the Division of Mackellar § 1990

Macquarie 
 This section is an excerpt from Electoral results for the Division of Macquarie § 1990

Mitchell 
 This section is an excerpt from Electoral results for the Division of Mitchell § 1990

New England 
 This section is an excerpt from Electoral results for the Division of New England § 1990

Newcastle 
 This section is an excerpt from Electoral results for the Division of Newcastle1990

North Sydney 
 This section is an excerpt from Electoral results for the Division of North Sydney § 1990

Page 
 This section is an excerpt from Electoral results for the Division of Page § 1990

Parkes 
 This section is an excerpt from Electoral results for the Division of Parkes § 1990

Parramatta 
 This section is an excerpt from Electoral results for the Division of Parramatta § 1990

Phillip 
 This section is an excerpt from Electoral results for the Division of Phillip § 1990

Prospect 
 This section is an excerpt from Electoral results for the Division of Prospect § 1990

Reid 
 This section is an excerpt from Electoral results for the Division of Reid § 1990

Richmond 
 This section is an excerpt from Electoral results for the Division of Richmond § 1990

Riverina-Darling 
 This section is an excerpt from Electoral results for the Division of Riverina-Darling § 1990

Robertson 
 This section is an excerpt from Electoral results for the Division of Robertson § 1990

Shortland 
 This section is an excerpt from Electoral results for the Division of Shortland § 1990

St George 
 This section is an excerpt from Electoral results for the Division of St George § 1990

Sydney 
 This section is an excerpt from Electoral results for the Division of Sydney § 1990

Throsby 
 This section is an excerpt from Electoral results for the Division of Throsby § 1990

Warringah 
 This section is an excerpt from Electoral results for the Division of Warringah § 1990

Wentworth 
 This section is an excerpt from Electoral results for the Division of Wentworth § 1990

Werriwa 
 This section is an excerpt from Electoral results for the Division of Werriwa § 1990

See also 

 Members of the Australian House of Representatives, 1990–1993

Notes

References 

New South Wales 1990